Thiobarbital is a drug which is a barbiturate derivative. It is the thiobarbiturate analogue of barbital.

Synthesis 

It is of note that although the drug can be prepared by the above route (cf e.g. thialbarbital), reaction of barbital with phosphorus pentasulfide constitutes an alternative route to thiobarbital.

References 

Thiobarbiturates
GABAA receptor positive allosteric modulators